The GNR(I) class U was a class of 4-4-0 steam locomotives built for the Great Northern Railway (Ireland).

History
Five were built by Beyer, Peacock and Company in 1915. The class was so successful that an additional batch of five was built in 1947, making them the last inside-cylinder 4-4-0 locomotives to be manufactured anywhere in the world.

The earlier locomotives were initially unnamed. However, after the later locomotives were delivered with names of counties along the GNR(I) route, the earlier locomotives received names of Loughs.

Withdrawal
All were still in service in 1958 when the GNR(I) was divided between the Ulster Transport Authority (UTA) and Córas Iompair Éireann (CIÉ), with each receiving five locomotives.

No. 198 Lough Swilly was the first to be withdrawn in 1959 before its CIÉ number (198N) was applied. CIÉ withdrew steam traction in 1963, whereas the UTA withdrew their U class fleet between 1961 and 1965. None of the class were preserved.

Fleet list

Model
An 00 gauge model of No. 205 Down is currently available as an etched-brass kit from Studio Scale Models. It includes transfers, brass etches and cast white metal parts.

References

U
4-4-0 locomotives
Beyer, Peacock locomotives
Railway locomotives introduced in 1915
Steam locomotives of Northern Ireland
Steam locomotives of Ireland
Passenger locomotives
Scrapped locomotives
5 ft 3 in gauge locomotives
2′B h2 locomotives